AMSilk is an industrial supplier of synthetic silk biopolymers. The polymers are biocompatible and breathable. The company was founded in 2008 and has its headquarters at the IZB in Planegg near Munich. AMSilk is an industrial biotechnology company with a proprietary production process for their silk materials.

AMSilk produces a lightweight material trademarked as Biosteel, created from recombinant spider silk, which was used by Adidas to create a biodegradable running shoe. Jens Klein, CEO of AMSilk, said during an interview that the biodegradable material can help reduce the amount of waste that has to be burned or pollutes the environment.

AMSilk is also developing breast implants made of biodegradable spider silk in collaboration with the German company Polytech.

References

External links 
 AMSilk Homepage

Materials science organizations
Natural materials
Polyamides
Silk
Spider anatomy